is a Japanese actress and voice actress affiliated with Production Baobab.

Filmography

Television animation
 Yumi Kusaka (First), Tomochan, Cameraman in Crayon Shin-chan (1995)
 Saaya Hanazono in Mama Loves the Poyopoyo-Saurus (1995)
 Himeko Jougasaki in Chibi Maruko-chan (1995)
 Maid in Fushigi Yûgi (1995)
 Girl in Romeo's Blue Skies (1995)
 Chisato/Mrs. Roku in Magical Girl Pretty Sammy (1996)
 Mikako Sato in Martian Successor Nadesico (1996)
 Yuko Ohse in Revolutionary Girl Utena (1997)
 Naoko Yanagisawa in Cardcaptor Sakura (1998)
 Jessica in Trigun (1998)
 Goro's Mother in Angel Tales (2001)
 Shimizu Mother Major (2005) 
 Sister in Atashin'chi (2002)
 Young Kouya in The Twelve Kingdoms (2002)
 Kyabetsu in Croquette! (2003)
 Kaoru Ichinose in Detective Academy Q (2003)
 Kyabetsu in Human Crossing (2003)
 Marine in Fullmetal Alchemist (2003)
 Chappu in MÄR (2005)
 Etsuko Ichikawa in Darker than Black (2007)
 Carine ne Britannia in Code Geass (2008)
 Chouun, Shiryuu (Sei) in Koihime Musou (2008)
 Manager in Captain Earth (2014)

Theatrical animation
 Naoko Yanagisawa in Cardcaptor Sakura Movie 2: The Sealed Card (2000)
 Ai in Inuyasha the Movie: Fire on the Mystic Island (2004)

OVA
 Kumiko Nagashima in Dokyusei 2 (1996)
 Chouun, Shiryuu (Sei) in Koihime Musou OVA (2009)

Video games
 Amy Rose in Sonic Shuffle (2000)
 Arle Nadja and Doppelganger Arle in Puyo Puyon (1999)
 Chouun, Shiryuu (Sei) in Koihime Musou (2007)
 Chouun, Shiryuu (Sei) in Shin Koihime Musou (2008)
 Kyoko Morimura in First Kiss Story (1998)
 Maria in Private Nurse (2002)
 Moeko Itou in Shiny Days (2012)
 Moeko Itou in Strip Battle Days 2 (2016)
 Sumire Nosaki in Tokimeki Memorial 2 (1999)
 Shizuku Mizumo in Yume no Tsubasa (2000)
 Yuko in Kisetsu wo Dakishimete (1998)
 Yuuko Kouzuki in Muv-Luv (2003)

External links
 Emi Motoi at Ryu's Seiyuu Info
 

1971 births
Living people
Voice actresses from Kanagawa Prefecture
Japanese video game actresses
Japanese voice actresses
20th-century Japanese actresses
21st-century Japanese actresses
Production Baobab voice actors